Biddle is a village in southeastern Powder River County, Montana, United States, near the Little Powder River.  It lies along Highway 59, south of the town of Broadus, the county seat of Powder River County.  Its elevation is 3,337 feet (1,017 m).
It offers basic services not only to the community, but those that are passing through as well: a mercantile store with gas pumps, lodging through the mercantile, a post office, a one-room school accommodating grades K-8, a volunteer fire department and a small church.

The post office was established in 1916 with Charles Schofield as postmaster. It was later taken over by Roland Rumph and in 2010 the post office was built and currently ran by USPS. The town name came from S. F. B. Biddle, former owner of the large Cross Ranch, now currently owned by Nathan and Connie Rumph.

Demographics

As of 2010, the current estimated population of Biddle is 61. The median age for a person living in Biddle is 49. The average number of persons per household is 2.29. The median household income is $24,167.

Climate
According to the Köppen Climate Classification system, Biddle has a semi-arid climate, abbreviated "BSk" on climate maps.

References

Census-designated places in Powder River County, Montana